Dean Smith (1931–2015) was an American college basketball coach.

Dean Smith may also refer to:

Politics
Dean Smith (Australian politician) (born 1969), Australian senator
Dean Smith (Canadian politician) (born 1928), former political figure in British Columbia, Canada

Sports
Dean Smith (sprinter) (born 1932), American Olympic track and field athlete and stuntman
Dean Barton-Smith (born 1967), Australian former decathlete
Dean Smith (footballer, born 1971), English football player and manager of Norwich City
Dean Smith (footballer, born 1958) (1958–2009), English football player for Leicester City and Brentford
Dean Smith (racing driver) (born 1988), British racing driver

Other people
Dean Smith (pilot) (1899–1987), American airmail pilot
Dean Smith (engineer), Walter Byers Award winner
Dean Smith (actor) (born 1990), starred in Waterloo Road
Dean Wesley Smith (born 1950), science fiction author